The Mixed doubles event of badminton at the 2010 Commonwealth Games was held from 10 October – 14 October 2010 in Siri Fort Sports Complex, New Delhi, India.

Finals

References
Reports

Badminton at the 2010 Commonwealth Games
Commonwealth